Trichromia flavoroseus is a moth in the family Erebidae. It was described by Francis Walker in 1855. It is found in Mexico and Honduras.

References

Moths described in 1855
flavoroseus